Anton Yuryev is a Russian American scientist.

Career
Anton Yuryev was born in Moscow, Russia in 1966.  He is son of Dmitri Furman, Russian political scientist, sociologist, and expert on religions.

Yuryev was awarded Ph.D. at Johns Hopkins University for discovery of novel family of proteins interacting with C-terminal domain of RNA polymerase II holoenzyme using yeast two-hybrid screening. Sequence similarity of these proteins to splicing factors suggested the existence of physical coupling between transcription and post-transcriptional modification of messenger RNA. He continued his research as postdoctoral fellow at Novartis Pharmaceuticals where he demonstrated that mammalian ARAF protein kinase can be imported into mitochondria.
During the completion of human genome sequencing he started working in the new emerging field of bioinformatics.  While working at Orchid Biosciences between 2001 and 2003 he authored several algorithms for PCR primer design using statistical modeling. Anton Yuryev was one of the original owner of Ariadne Genomics Inc where he has developed methods for Natural Language Processing, for computational Pathway analysis, and studied properties of Biological network.  Anton Yuryev has edited several scientific books and numerous research articles. 
Ariadne Genomics Inc was acquired by Elsevier in 2011.  He is now working as a Consulting and Professional Service Director at Elsevier.

Personal life
Anton Yuryev is married to Alexandra Belenkaya.  He has two daughters from the first marriage - Alisa Kasimova and Kristina Kasimova, step daughter - Victoria Thomas, and son Clement Yuryev from his second marriage.

Education
Dr. Anton Yuryev received his B.Sc. in physics from Moscow Institute of Physics and Technology in 1987.
Dr. Anton Yuryev received his Ph.D. in Molecular Biology and Genetics from Johns Hopkins University in 1995.

Articles

 Comparative genomics of two jute species and insight into fibre biogenesis Islam MS, Saito JA, Emdad EM, Ahmed B, Islam MM, Halim A, Hossen QM, Hossain MZ, Ahmed R, Hossain MS, Kabir SM, Khan MS, Khan MM, Hasan R, Aktar N, Honi U, Islam R, Rashid MM, Wan X, Hou S, Haque T, Azam MS, Moosa MM, Elias SM, Hasan AM, Mahmood N, Shafiuddin M, Shahid S, Shommu NS, Jahan S, Roy S, Chowdhury A, Akhand AI, Nisho GM, Uddin KS, Rabeya T, Hoque SM, Snigdha AR, Mortoza S, Matin SA, Islam MK, Lashkar MZ, Zaman M, Yuryev A, Uddin MK, Rahman MS, Haque MS, Alam MM, Khan H, Alam M. Nat Plants. 2017 Jan 30;3:16223
 Deep RNA profiling identified CLOCK and molecular clock genes as pathophysiological signatures in collagen VI myopathy Scotton C, Bovolenta M, Schwartz E, Falzarano MS, Martoni E, Passarelli C, Armaroli A, Osman H, Rodolico C, Messina S, Pegoraro E, D'Amico A, Bertini E, Gualandi F, Neri M, Selvatici R, Boffi P, Maioli MA, Lochmüller H, Straub V, Bushby K, Castrignanò T, Pesole G, Sabatelli P, Merlini L, Braghetta P, Bonaldo P, Bernardi P, Foley R, Cirak S, Zaharieva I, Muntoni F, Capitanio D, Gelfi C, Kotelnikova E, Yuryev A, Lebowitz M, Zhang X, Hodge BA, Esser KA, Ferlini A.J Cell Sci. 2016 Apr 15;129(8):1671-84
 Gene expression profiling for targeted cancer treatment Yuryev A. Expert Opin Drug Discov. 2015 Jan;10(1):91-9
 Facial pain with localized and widespread manifestations: separate pathways of vulnerability Slade GD, Smith SB, Zaykin DV, Tchivileva IE, Gibson DG, Yuryev A, Mazo I, Bair E, Fillingim R, Ohrbach R, Greenspan J, Maixner W, Diatchenko L. Pain. 2013 Nov;154(11):2335-43
 Draft genome sequence of the rubber tree Hevea brasiliensis Rahman AY, Usharraj AO, Misra BB, Thottathil GP, Jayasekaran K, Feng Y, Hou S, Ong SY, Ng FL, Lee LS, Tan HS, Sakaff MK, Teh BS, Khoo BF, Badai SS, Aziz NA, Yuryev A, Knudsen B, Dionne-Laporte A, Mchunu NP, Yu Q, Langston BJ, Freitas TA, Young AG, Chen R, Wang L, Najimudin N, Saito JA, Alam M. BMC Genomics. 2013 Feb 2;14:75
 Contextual data integration in drug discovery. Yuryev A.Expert Opin Drug Discov. 2012 Aug;7(8):659-66. 
 10.4056/sigs.2445005 Complete genome sequencing and analysis of Saprospira grandis str. Lewin, a predatory marine bacterium Saw JH, Yuryev A, Kanbe M, Hou S, Young AG, Aizawa S, Alam M. Stand Genomic Sci. 2012 Mar 19;6(1):84-93.
 Integrating fragmented software applications into holistic solutions: focus on drug discovery Yuryev A, Expert Opinion on Drug Discovery, April 2011, 6(4):383-392(10)
 Analysis and construction of pathogenicity island regulatory pathways in Salmonella enterica serovar Typhi Ong SY, Ng FL, Badai SS, Yuryev A, Alam M, J Integr Bioinform. 2010 Sep 23;7(1)
 Custom CGH array profiling of copy number variations (CNVs) on chromosome 6p21.32 (HLA locus) in patients with venous malformations associated with multiple sclerosis Ferlini A, Bovolenta M, Neri M, Gualandi F, Balboni A, Yuryev A, Salvi F, Gemmati D, Liboni A, Zamboni P, BMC Med Genet. 2010 Apr 28;11(1):64
 Atlas of Signaling for Interpretation of Microarray experiments Kotelnikova E, Ivanikova N, Kalinin A, Yuryev A, Daraselia N, PLoS One 2010, v5(2):e9256
 Computational approaches for drug repositioning and combination therapy design Kotelnikova EA, Yuryev A, Daraselia N.  Journal of Bioinformatics and Computational Biology, J Bioinform Comput Biol. 2010 Jun;8(3):593-606
 Ariadne's ChemEffect and Pathway Studio knowledge base Yuryev A, Kotelnikova E, Daraselia N. Expert Opinion on Drug Discovery 2009, v4(12) 1307-1318
 In silico pathway analysis: the final frontier towards completely rational drug design Yuryev A. Expert Opinion on Drug Discovery 2008; v3(8):867-876(10)
 Methane oxidation by an extremely acidophilic bacterium of the phylum Verrucomicrobia Dunfield PF, Yuryev A, Senin P, Smirnova AV, Stott MB, Hou S, Ly B, Saw JH, Zhou Z, Ren Y, Wang J, Mountain BW, Crowe MA, Weatherby TM, Bodelier PL, Liesack W, Feng L, Wang L, Alam M. Nature. 2007 Dec 6;450(7171):879-82. Epub 2007 November 14.
 Developing a statistical model for primer design Huang J, Yuryev A. Methods Mol Biol 2007; 402:105-38. Review.
 PCR primer design using statistical modeling  Yuryev A. Methods Mol Biol. 2007; 402:93-104.
 Prediction of Protein-protein Interactions on the Basis of Evolutionary Conservation of Protein Functions Kotelnikova E, Kalinin A, Yuryev A, and Maslov S. Evolutionary Bioinformatics 2007: 3
 Molecular networks in microarray analysis Sivachenko AY, Yuryev A, Daraselia N, Mazo I. J Bioinform Comput Biol. 2007 Apr;5(2b):429-56.
 Automatic extraction of gene ontology annotation and its correlation with clusters in protein networks Daraselia N, Yuryev A, Egorov S, Mazo I, Ispolatov I. BMC Bioinformatics. 2007 Jul 10;8(1):243
 Pathway analysis for design of promiscuous drugs and selective drug mixtures Sivachenko A, Kalinin A, Yuryev A. Curr Drug Discov Technol. 2006 Dec;3(4):269-77
 P Pathway analysis software as a tool for drug target selection, prioritization and validation of drug mechanism Sivachenko AY, Yuryev A. Expert Opinion on Therapeutic Targets, 2007 Mar;11(3):411-21
 Targeting transcription factors in cell regulation  Yuryev A. Expert Opinion on Therapeutic Targets, 2006 June; Vol. 10, No. 3, 345-349
 Finding mesoscopic communities in sparse networks Ispolatov I, Mazo I, and Yuryev A.  J. Stat. Mech., 2006 P09014.
 Pathway Analysis in Drug Development. Badretdinov A, Yuryev A, Pharma & Bio Ingredients, March 2006
 Automatic pathway building in biological association networks Yuryev A, Mulyukov Z, Kotelnikova E, Maslov S, Egorov S, Nikitin A, Daraselia N, Mazo I. BMC Bioinformatics. 2006 Mar 24; 7:171.
 Identifying Local Gene Expression Patterns in Biomolecular Networks Sivachenko AY, Yuryev A, Daraselia N, Mazo I. IEEE Computational Systems Bioinformatics Conference, 8-11 Aug. 2005.
 Cliques and duplication-divergence network growth Ispolatov, I, Krapivsky, PL, Mazo I, Yuryev A. New J.Phys. 2005; 7:145
 Binding properties and evolution of homodimers in protein-protein interaction networks  Ispolatov I, Yuryev A, Mazo I, Maslov S. Nucleic Acids Res. 2005 Jun 27;33(11):3629-35.
 Experimental validation of data mined single nucleotide polymorphisms from several databases and consecutive dbSNP builds Edvardsen H, Irene Grenaker Alnaes G, Tsalenko A, Mulcahy T, Yuryev A, Lindersson M, Lien S, Omholt S, Syvanen AC, Borresen-Dale AL, Kristensen VN. Pharmacogenet Genomics. 2006 Mar;16(3):207-217.
 Duplication-divergence model of protein interaction network Ispolatov, P.L.Krapivsky, Yuryev A. Phys Rev E Stat Nonlin Soft Matter Phys. 2005 Jun;71
 Extracting human protein interactions from MEDLINE using a full-sentence parser Daraselia N, Yuryev A, Egorov S, Novichkova S, Nikitin A, Mazo I. Bioinformatics. 2004 Mar 22; 20(5): 604-11
 A simple and practical dictionary-based approach for identification of proteins in Medline abstracts Egorov S, Yuryev A, Daraselia N.T. J Am Med Inform Assoc. 2004 May-Jun;11(3):174-8.
 Auto-validation of fluorescent primer extension genotyping assay using signal clustering and neural networks  Huang C-Yu, Studebaker J, Yuryev A, Huang J, Scott K, Kuebler J, Varde S. Alfisi S, Gelfand G, Pohl M, Boyce-Jacino MT.  BMC Bioinformatics. 2004 Apr 02; 5(1): 36
 Primer design and marker clustering for multiplex primer extension genotyping reaction using statistical modeling Yuryev A, Huang J, Donaldson M, Pohl M, Patch R, Boyce-Jacino MT. Nucleic Acids Research, 2002, Vol. 30, No. 23 e131.
 Novel RAF kinase protein-protein interactions found by exhaustive yeast two-hybrid analysis  Yuryev A and Wennogle LP.  Genomics, 2003 Feb;81(2):112-25.
 Predicting success of primer extension genotyping assay using statistical modeling Yuryev A, Huang J, Pohl M, Patch R, Watson F, Bell P, Donaldson M, Phillips MS, and Boyce-Jacino MT. Nucleic Acids Research, 2002, Vol. 30, No. 23 e131.
 A set of novel tools for PCR primer design Gorelenkov V, Antipov A, Lejnine S, Daraselia N, Yuryev A. Biotechniques. 2001 Dec;31(6):1326-30.
 Long PCR detection of the C4A null allele in B8-C4AQ0-C4B1-DR3 Grant SF, Kristjansdottir H, Steinsson K, Blondal T, Yuryev A, Stefansson K, Gulcher JR. J Immunol Methods. 2000 Oct 20;244(1-2):41-7.
 Isoform-Specific Localization of A-RAF in Mitochondria Yuryev A, Ono M, Goff SA, Macaluso F, Wennogle LP. Mol Cell Biol. 2000 Jul 1; 20(13): 4870–4878.
 Understanding the cellular uptake of phosphopeptides Allentoff AJ, Mandiyan S, Liang H, Yuryev A, Vlattas I, Duelfer T, Sytwu II, Wennogle LP. Cell Biochem Biophys. 1999; 31(2): 129–40.
 The RAF family: an expanding network of post-translational controls and protein-protein interactions  Yuryev A, Wennogle LP.  Cell Res 1998; 2: 81-98 (review)
 Mapping the substrate preferences of protein tyrosine phosphatase PTP-1B using combinatorial chemistry approaches Pellegrini MC, Liang H, Mandiyan S, Wang K, Yuryev A, Vlattas I, Sytwu T, Li Y-C, Wennogle LP.  Biochemistry 1998; 8: 15598–15606.
 Molecular and cellular characterization of baboon C-Raf as a target for anti-proliferative effects of antisense oligonucleotides Mandiyan S, Schumacher C, Cioffi C, Sharif H, Yuryev A, Lappe R, Monia B, Hanson S, Goff S, Wennogle LP. Antisense Nuc Acid Drug Dev 1997; 6:539-548.
 The C-terminal domain of the largest subunit of RNA polymerase II interacts with a novel set of serine/arginine-rich proteins  Yuryev A, Patturajan M, Litingtung Y, Joshi RV, Gentile C, Gebara M, Corden JL. Proc Natl Acad Sci U S A 1996; 93(14): 6975–6980.
 Suppression analysis reveals a functional difference between the serines in positions two and five in the consensus sequence of the C-terminal domain of yeast RNA polymerase II Yuryev A, and Corden JL. Genetics 1996; 143(2): 661–671.
 A Saccharomyces cerevisiae gene encoding a potential adenine phosphoribosyltransferase Yuryev A, and Corden JL. Yeast 1994;10 (5): 659–662.
 Determination of the structural basis for selective binding of Epstein-Barr virus to human complement receptor type 2 Martin DR, Yuryev A, Kalli KR, Fearon DT, Ahearn JM. J Exp Med 1991; 174 (6): 1299-1311
 Synthesis of Biotin Label and Combining it with oligonucleotide. Yuryev AD. Moscow Institute of Physics and Technology, Annual Reports, 1988 (in Russian)
 Molecular Cloning of Na.K-TPase cDNA. Yuryev AD, Makarevich OI. Moscow Institute of Physics and Technology, Annual Reports, 1988 (in Russian)

Books
 From Knowledge Networks to Biological Models A. Yuryev, N. Daraselia Bentham Science Publishers, 2011
 PCR Primer Design A. Yuryev Humana Press, 19 November 2010
 Pathway Analysis for Drug Discovery: Computational Infrastructure and Applications A. Yuryev John Wiley & Sons, 17 September 2008

Living people
1966 births
Moscow Institute of Physics and Technology alumni
Johns Hopkins University alumni
Scientists from Moscow